Vasiliu is a Romanian surname. Notable people with the surname include:

Constantin Dan Vasiliu (born 1951), Romanian politician
Grigore Vasiliu Birlic (1905–1970), Romanian actor
George Vasiliu, pen name of George Bacovia (1881–1957), a Romanian symbolist poet
Mircea Vasiliu (1920-2008), former Romanian diplomat, author
Alin Vasiliu (1960-2016), Physicist, Engineer

See also 
 Vasile (name)
 Vasilescu (surname)
 Vasilievca (disambiguation)

Romanian-language surnames